The South African Railways Class C1 4-6-2T of 1901 was a steam locomotive from the pre-Union era in the Natal Colony.

Between 1879 and 1885, the Natal Government Railways placed 37  Tenwheeler type tank steam locomotives in service. In 1901, one of them was rebuilt to a  Pacific type locomotive and in 1912, when it was assimilated into the South African Railways, it was renumbered and designated Class C1. During 1912, four more of these  locomotives were built by the South African Railways in the Durban workshops, using mostly surplus material.

Manufacturers
The Natal Government Railways (NGR) Class G  tank locomotives, initially known as the K&S Class after their builders, Kitson and Stephenson, were delivered between 1879 and 1884. They had plate frames and used Stephenson valve gear.

Rebuilding

In 1901, NGR Locomotive Superintendent George William Reid rebuilt one of the Kitson batch of 1882, no. 25, to a  Pacific type wheel arrangement for suburban passenger working on the South Coast line. The NGR later renumbered this locomotive to 38, but it remained known as a K&S type in NGR service until a classification system was introduced at some stage between 1904 and 1908, when it was designated NGR Class H.

It had a  longer wheelbase and was  longer over the couplers.

South African Railways
When the Union of South Africa was established on 31 May 1910, the three Colonial government railways (Cape Government Railways, NGR and Central South African Railways) were united under a single administration to control and administer the railways, ports and harbours of the Union. Although the South African Railways and Harbours came into existence in 1910, the actual classification and renumbering of all the rolling stock of the three constituent railways were only implemented with effect from 1 January 1912.

In 1912, this locomotive was designated Class C1 by the South African Railways (SAR) and renumbered 77. The rebuilt locomotive ran well and gave such good service that, also in 1912, the SAR built a further four Class C1 locomotives in the Durban workshops, mostly from spare parts and surplus material. These four were numbered in the range from 325 to 328.

Service
The Class C1 was used on suburban passenger working until more powerful locomotives became necessary. They were then relegated to shunting work at various depots until they were withdrawn from service in 1931 and scrapped.

References

1070
1070
4-6-2 locomotives
2′C1′ n2t locomotives
Kitson locomotives
NGR shop-built locomotives
SAR locomotives
Cape gauge railway locomotives
Railway locomotives introduced in 1901
1901 in South Africa
Scrapped locomotives